The Beige Brigade is a group of colourful and passionate New Zealand sport fans who identify themselves by wearing beige colours. A version of this beige uniform was worn by the New Zealand limited overs cricket team during the early 1980s (in contrast to the more familiar black, which is worn by almost all New Zealand sports teams, including the current cricket team).

The Beige Brigade began in 1999 as a group of dedicated New Zealand cricket fans began wearing home sewn beige uniforms to New Zealand matches.  These home-made kits echoed the much-maligned official beige team uniform of the 1980s. The uniform become popular as a gesture of solidarity and support for the New Zealand cricket team of the eighties who were very successful. Today, the Beige Brigade sell the uniforms to the general public together with a "moral contract" which explains the expectations that come with being a Beige Brigadier.

Such was the impact on the sporting culture of New Zealand, that NZC agreed to have the Black Caps wear a version of the beige uniform for the inaugural Twenty20 international between New Zealand and Australia. This was a far cry from the early days of the Beige Brigade when CEO Martin Snedden told the Brigade's top brass that "NZ Cricket had invested heavily in the black branding for the Black Caps and that a return to beige was completely out of the question." The decision to wear the beige uniforms did not go down well with the members of the Beige Brigade - certain members felt NZC had unjustly missed them out of the process, despite the work done by supporters designing, funding the manufacture of and popularising the clothing.

Since then, New Zealand supporters in beige have been seen at sporting fixtures all over the world including Rugby Union matches, and the Beige Brigade organise tours to selected major sporting events. The only other overseas Black Caps supporters club is the England-based London New Zealand Cricket Club, notable for their striped blazers that often appear on the camera at Lord's.

Although the Beige Brigade began with the mere donning of the replica beige shirt, what was once a recondite club has now become something akin to a youth movement, reducing all manner of icons of New Zealand pop culture circa 1981. Brigadiers and those who flatter them in imitation are now commonly seen sporting the very short shorts known as "Stubbies" and other items such as sweat bands, fluorescent zinc sunblock, and aviator sunglasses that were once staples of New Zealand summer menswear. During 2016 ICC World T20, the new kits also featured the retro beige colour, which was the colour that was worn when Twenty20 cricket was first introduced.

See also

London New Zealand Cricket Club

References

External links
 
 Stubbies
 Inaugural Twenty20 Match (BBC)
 Cricinfo Profile of the Beige Brigade

Cricket culture
Sports organisations of New Zealand
Sports spectators
1999 establishments in New Zealand